Richard Charles Stoll (March 21, 1876 – June 26, 1949) was a judge and prominent alumnus of the University of Kentucky (then known as Kentucky State College). He is the namesake of Stoll Field, and the origin for the school's color scheme.

Early years
Richard C. Stoll was born on March 21, 1876 in Lexington, Kentucky to Richard P. and Elvina Stoll.

College

Kentucky State College

Stoll was a varsity letterman for the Kentucky Wildcats football team.  The 1891 team's colors were blue and light yellow, decided before the Centre–Kentucky game on December 19. A student asked "What color blue?" and Stoll pulled off his necktie, and held it up. This is still held as the origin of Kentucky's shade of blue.  The next year light yellow was dropped and changed to white.

Yale
After his time at Kentucky State College, he entered Yale Law school.

References

External links

1876 births
1949 deaths
Kentucky Wildcats football players
Players of American football from Lexington, Kentucky
American judges